General Hospital is an American television serial drama, airing on ABC. The show was created by Frank and Doris Hursley, who originally set it in a general hospital in an unnamed fictional city. The series premiered on April 1, 1963. In the 1970s, the city was named Port Charles, New York.

Present characters

Scout Cain

Scout Cain is the daughter of Drew Cain and Sam McCall. She was introduced in February 2017 and is named in honor of her adoptive aunt, Emily Quartermaine.

Lori and Sevan Andonian were first cast as Emily Scout Cain. Palmer and Poe Parker were cast next and portrayed the role for almost two years. In mid-2019, Ella Ramacieri was cast in the role and debuted July 1 of the same year.

Charlotte Cassadine

Charlotte Cassadine is the daughter of Valentin Cassadine and Lulu Spencer, carried by Claudette Beaulieu. She was born from an embryo that Helena Cassadine created and tried to pass off as Stavros' child with Lulu. Claudette realized that Valentin was dangerous after Charlotte was born, and ran away with her. She later asked her ex-husband, Nathan West, to protect them. Claudette tells Nathan that Charlotte is his daughter, but when a DNA test disproves it, Claudette claims her ex-lover, Griffin Munro, is Charlotte's father. When Claudette realizes Valentin has found her, she skips town and leaves Charlotte behind with Griffin. Valentin tells Griffin that he is Charlotte's father, and Nathan receives a note from Claudette affirming the claim. Griffin petitions to have custody of Charlotte, but the judge grants full custody to Valentin. After Charlotte meets Lulu, she finds out the truth about Charlotte. Lulu petitions Valentin for custody, but he is granted sole custody while she is granted supervised weekly visits. Although Charlotte was distant from Lulu at first, the two grow closer. Months later, Valentin and Lulu share joint custody. Charlotte remains close to Nina Reeves.

Spencer Cassadine

Spencer Cassadine is the son of Nikolas Cassadine and Courtney Matthews, introduced in February 2006. He was originally believed to be the son of Jasper Jacks, and Jax decides to keep the secret after Courtney dies. He names the baby John Michael Jacks in honor of Jax and Courtney's fathers. Robin Scorpio learns the truth and announces it at the baby's christening. Nikolas renames the baby Spencer Cassadine in honor of his siblings Lucky and Lulu Spencer. Spencer is kidnapped soon after by his nanny, Colleen McHenry. Before Nikolas can rescue Spencer, he is taken by Helena from Colleen. Nikolas and Emily Quartermaine eventually rescue him. Spencer leaves town with his father and returns with his great-grandmother Lesley Webber.

At his tenth birthday party, Spencer suffers burns and smoke inhalation when a fire breaks out. After Nikolas is presumed dead, Spencer is put under the care of his grandmother Laura Spencer. Spencer asks Laura to let him go to boarding school in France, as Nikolas had planned to enroll Spencer there. She agrees and Spencer leaves. He returns the following summer, intent on getting revenge on Valentin, who is believed to have murdered Nikolas. He is kidnapped by Garvey to draw out Sonny Corinthos, Spencer's uncle. Spencer escapes and Laura sends him back to boarding school for his safety.

When Nikolas returns, he visits Spencer in France with Ava Jerome, his new wife. Spencer is initially happy to see his father but becomes angry when he finds out Nikolas intentionally stayed away to reclaim the Cassadine inheritance from Valentin. Spencer tells Nikolas to stay away and leave him alone. He returns as a young man to Port Charles over a year later, and stalks and harasses Nikolas and Ava by impersonating Ryan Chamberlain to get them to separate.

Wiley Cooper-Jones

Wiley Cooper-Jones is the son of Michael Corinthos and Nelle Benson, introduced on July 31, 2018. Nelle delivers the baby with Liesl Obrecht's help. Nelle runs into Brad Cooper, who is mourning the loss of his adoptive son, Wiley Cooper-Jones. She convinces Brad to switch the babies out of spite towards Michael. Brad takes the baby home to his husband Lucas Jones, while Michael is convinced his son died. In late 2019, Brad reveals to Lucas that Wiley is not their son. Wiley is almost kidnapped by Nelle when she learns Michael knows the truth, but Michael finds her and is reunited with his son. Nelle sues Michael for full custody, but the judge grants full custody to Michael and denies Nelle visitation. Wiley is kidnapped by Nelle, but before she can disappear, Michael finds them and brings Wiley home. After Nelle's death, Wiley is adopted by Willow Tait, Michael's wife and Nelle's twin sister.

Avery Corinthos

Avery Corinthos is the daughter of Sonny Corinthos and Ava Jerome. Avery is born onscreen in November 2014, and kidnapped by Nina Reeves and Franco Baldwin. They relocate to Canada, where Avery is rescued and returned to her mother. When she was born, it was not known whether Sonny or his son Morgan was the father, until a DNA test shows it is Sonny. When both her parents are imprisoned, Avery is primarily raised by her siblings Morgan and Kiki Jerome. Sonny is released and takes custody of Avery, but his son Michael sues and wins full custody before giving Avery back to Sonny. When Ava is released, Avery's parents go to court for custody. The judge grant Ava sole custody of Avery, with Sonny getting supervised visits. When Ava gets threatened, she returns Avery to Sonny to keep her safe. Ava tries to take Avery back later, but is blackmailed by Carly with a sex tape of her and Paul Hornsby. Paul threatens to send Ava to jail with a recording of her admission about killing Connie. Sonny relents and gives Ava limited visitation with Avery until Sonny and Carly learn about Ava's part in Morgan's death. In May 2018, Ava blackmails Sonny into giving her joint custody after Avery is reported missing.

Donna Corinthos

Donna Corinthos is the daughter of Sonny and Carly Corinthos introduced on September 30, 2019. It is revealed during prenatal testing that Donna has spina bifida, which is treated shortly after her birth.

Leo Falconeri 

Leo Falconeri is the son of Julian Jerome and Olivia Falconeri. Olivia initially claims Ned Quartermaine is the father to protect Leo from Julian's world. Leo was introduced in May 2015 as a premature birth. Olivia, Ned, and Liesl fake his death. Olivia returns in August and reveals that she named her son Leonardo. Olivia brings Leo to town and lies about him being an adopted son named Mateo. Alexis Davis is suspicious and runs a DNA test. When Julian finds out, he confronts Olivia and they agree to joint custody of Leo. Julian loses custody after being blackmailed into going back to his criminal life. Olivia allows Julian to be in Leo's life again after his recent release. In 2017, Ned becomes Leo's stepfather, and in 2022, Ned adopts Leo.

Rocco Falconeri 

Rocco Falconeri is the son of Dante Falconeri and Lulu Spencer, carried by Britt Westbourne.  Britt originally passes him off as Patrick Drake's son. He is born onscreen in September 2013, and Britt later names him Ben. Ben is later kidnapped by Liesl, who takes Ben to Cassadine Island. He is rescued by Britt and Nikolas Cassadine. Elizabeth Webber notices that Ben and Dante have the same food allergy, and secretly runs a DNA test to confirm Dante is Ben's father. Britt lets Dante have shared custody of Ben, hoping to keep her secret from coming out. Elizabeth learns the truth and tells Lulu and Dante. Before they can claim their son, Liesl kidnaps Ben to help Britt leave town with him. Britt turns Liesl into the police and Ben is rescued. Lulu and Dante are reunited with their son, whom they rename Rocco Falconeri.

Josslyn Jacks

Josslyn Jacks is the daughter of Jasper "Jax" Jacks and Carly Corinthos. After her birth, Claudia Zacchara tries to take the baby away from Carly, but is stopped when Michael kills her. Josslyn is christened, with Jason Morgan and Lulu Spencer as her godparents. When Josslyn is diagnosed with a rare form of kidney cancer, she is saved by a kidney donation from Jake Spencer after he is killed in a hit-and-run accident. It is discovered later that the kidney is not Jake's, and that Jax had arranged for Josslyn to get Nelle Benson's kidney. Jax and Carly fight over custody of Josslyn, and Carly wins sole custody. Jax kidnaps Josslyn, but he returns her to Carly. Josslyn is kidnapped by Dr. Ewen Keenan on orders from Jerry Jacks, Josslyn's uncle. Jerry injects Josslyn with a substance and she is briefly hospitalized with a high fever. Jerry later reveals that he inoculated Josslyn against a poison that he put into the Port Charles water supply. She has a troubled relationship with Sonny after he has Jax deported.

Bailey Jones

Bailey Louise Jones is the daughter of Maxie Jones and Peter August. She is introduced in May 2021 after Maxie escapes from Marie Hopkins, who is hired by Peter to induce Maxie's labor so he could leave the country with them and avoid prosecution for his crimes. Maxie goes into labor and delivers Louise with the help of Austin Gatlin Holt. Marie tries to force Maxie to return with her and Louise. Maxie fights her off and runs, tricking Marie into falling to her death. To keep Louise safe from Peter, Maxie gives Louise to Brook Lynn Quartermaine, who is faking a pregnancy to get Valentin to give her shares of ELQ, her family's company. Brook Lynn brings Louise back and calls her Bailey Lois Quartermaine.

Peter discovers Bailey is Louise, and kidnaps her, trying to force Maxie to leave town with him. Maxie, though, convinces him to leave Louise behind, so Louise won't be forced to live on the run. Louise is rescued, and Brook Lynn looks after her while Felicia & Anna Devane try to rescue Maxie. Peter dies and Maxie is rescued, and is finally reunited with her daughter. She decides to name her daughter Bailey Louise, and names Brook Lynn her honorary mother.

Danny Morgan

Danny Morgan is the son of Jason Morgan and Sam McCall.

Casting
Gage and Gavin had the role initially in 2012 before being replaced by Jaxon and Jakob Kring from 2012 to 2014. Due to child labor laws and the amount of scenes Danny had, Claire and Juliette were cast, and alternated scenes with Jaxon and Jakob in 2012. Caden and Corben Rothweiler were cast from 2014 to 2015. Braiden and Dylan Kazowski were cast from 2015 to 2016. TK Weaver was cast from 2016 to May 2019. On May 31, 2019, Porter Fasullo took over the role.

Storylines
Danny Morgan was born onscreen in June 2012. Danny is initially believed to be the son of Sam's alleged rapist, Franco. He is switched at birth by Todd Manning and Heather Webber with Téa Delgado's stillborn son, Victor Lord III. Téa takes him home to Llanview, and Jason later figures out Sam's baby was switched with Téa's. Heather kidnaps the baby, and Jason and Sam rescue their son, naming him in honor of his adoptive uncle, Danny McCall, and great-grandfather, Edward Quartermaine. Danny is diagnosed with leukemia on his first birthday. When Danny does not respond to treatment, Sam looks for a bone marrow donor. Julian Jerome gives a bone marrow transplant, saving his grandson's life.

Aiden Spencer 

Aiden Spencer is the son of Lucky Spencer and Elizabeth Webber. From 2011 to 2012, the role was played by Titus Jackson, real-life son to Jonathan Jackson, who played his on-screen father, Lucky. Jason David took over the role in 2012.    

Aiden is born onscreen in July 2010 and is originally believed to be Nikolas Cassadine's son after Helena switches a paternity test. Aiden is kidnapped by Franco and given to his mother. Lucky finds Aiden and returns him to Elizabeth and Nikolas. Elizabeth gets another DNA test, which confirms Lucky is his father. She tells Lucky and Nikolas months later, and Nikolas briefly kidnaps Aiden before returning him to Elizabeth and Lucky. When Aiden is diagnosed with immune thrombocytopenic purpura, he receives a blood transfusion from his aunt Lulu and fully recovers.  In 2018-19, Aiden is harshly bullied in school because the class assumes he might be gay. His cousin Charlotte Cassadine is found to be one of the main instigators. His brother Cameron defends him, and Elizabeth and Franco try to get his teacher, Willow, to step in and intervene. Elizabeth chooses to accept Aiden if he ever comes out as gay.

Georgie Spinelli

Georgie Spinelli is the daughter of Damian Spinelli and Maxie Jones. Maxie tries to pass her off as  Dante and Lulu Falconeri's, whom she agrees to be a surrogate for until she miscarried. Maxie gives birth via C-section; Dante and Lulu name the baby Constanza "Connie" Louise Falconeri, and ask Maxie and Damien to be her godparents. At the christening, Brad Cooper arrives and tells Dante and Lulu that Connie is Maxie and Damien's biological daughter. After a custody battle, Spinelli is awarded full custody of Connie, while Maxie is not allowed to have any contact with her daughter for six months. In mid-December, Damien and his girlfriend, Ellie Trout, move with Connie to Portland. Despite the court order, Damien takes the baby to say goodbye to Maxie and they rename her Georgie after Maxie's late sister and Spinelli's good friend, Georgie Jones. Maxie is granted visitation rights by a judge and spends the holidays with Georgie. Damien and Georgie temporarily move back to Port Charles when Damien tries to reconcile with Maxie. He later reconciles with Ellie, and takes Georgie back to Portland with her.

Cameron Webber

Cameron Webber is the biological son of Zander Smith and Elizabeth Webber.

Casting
Ashwyn Bagga was cast as Cameron Steven Webber from 2005 to 2006. Braeden Walkes took over the role in 2006 until 2012. Michael Leone was cast as Cameron in 2013 and left in 2018. Anthony Saliba briefly portrayed the character in 2013. Cade McWatt took over the role on July 3, 2018. In August 2018, it was announced that he was let go from the series with William Lipton cast in the role.

Background
Elizabeth is in a stormy marriage with Ric Lansing, and finds it hard to trust him due to his fascination for revenge against his brother, Sonny Corinthos. After Elizabeth miscarries his child, Ric blames Sonny and takes Carly hostage to give her unborn baby to Elizabeth to raise. Elizabeth finds out and is horrified by Ric's actions. On October 31, 2003, she sleeps with Zander Smith for the second time and ends up pregnant. Due to Zander's dangerous lifestyle, Elizabeth and Ric (who have reconciled) decide to raise the child together without Zander's involvement, who agrees. Elizabeth divorces Ric when she realizes that he will not let go of his obsession with Sonny. Before Zander's death in a police shootout, Elizabeth agrees to name their son Cameron in honor of Zander's father, Cameron Lewis.

Storylines
Cameron is introduced in May 2004 in California before he and Elizabeth arrive in Port Charles a month later. Elizabeth raises him as a single mother, and he is often left in the care of Elizabeth's grandmother, Audrey Hardy, while Elizabeth studies to become a certified nurse at General Hospital. When she marries Lucky Spencer in 2005, he becomes the father figure in Cameron's life. Although they divorce in late 2007, and Lucky does not legally adopt him, the Spencers maintain a presence in Cameron's life. Cameron accidentally sets Elizabeth's house on fire while playing with matches, sending Elizabeth to the hospital when she goes to rescue his little brother Jake. In January 2011, Cameron is on the bus during the General Hospital ski trip when it crashs, but avoids being severely injured.

In 2014, Cameron and his cousin Spencer Cassadine fight over who gets to "date" Emma Scorpio-Drake's boyfriend. Cameron and Emma dance together the night of the Nurses' Ball, but their performance is interrupted by Spencer. Later, Cameron helps Ric reconnect with Elizabeth. At the 2015 Nurses' Ball, Cameron and Emma are set to perform the tango again but are interrupted again by Spencer, who throws sandbags on the stage.

In 2017, his aunt Hayden shows up and offers to take him for the day. After getting a treat at the coffee kiosk, Spencer and Cameron start arguing about Emma, and Spencer starts a food fight that is stopped by their grandmother, Laura Spencer. 

In early August 2018, Cameron is caught stealing earbuds.

Jake Webber

Jake Webber is the son of Jason Morgan and Elizabeth Webber.

Storylines
Jason agrees to let Elizabeth and Lucky Spencer raise the baby to protect him from Jason's mob business. Jake is kidnapped by Maureen Harper, but is rescued by Jason and returned to Elizabeth. Jake is again kidnapped by Jason's enemies and rescued by Sam McCall. In March 2011, Jake is struck by Luke Spencer in a hit-and-run incident. He is declared brain-dead and placed on life support. Lucky and Elizabeth agree to give Jake's kidney to Josslyn Jacks, who has cancer. In July 2015, he is revealed to be alive after being kidnapped by Helena Cassadine. He is rescued by Lucky, Luke, and Laura, and returns home to be raised by Drew and Elizabeth. When Drew and Elizabeth's engagement ends, Jake is upset and tries to get Drew to come back home, and vandalizes the house to try to get his parents to reconcile. Sam tries to help Jake when she figures this out, but Jake panics and runs away. Sam follows him, but she slips and falls down the stairs. Scared that he hurt Sam, Jake runs away on his bike and gets hit by a car. Jake survives and is taken to a children's hospital, where he recovers from his injuries. Jake is conditioned by Helena, and at the 2017 Nurses Ball. He receives a dangerous chemical weapon created by the WSB known as the Chimera. He was allowed to do his magic routine after the Nurse's Ball ended, where he almost opened the Chimera. He was stopped by Drew, Elizabeth, and Valentin.

James West

James West is the son of Nathan West and Maxie Jones, introduced on May 21, 2018.

Sally Brown was cast as James Malcolm West, who were replaced by the Marciano twins. On August 30, 2019, Kyler and Caleb Ends were recast for the role.

Storylines
Maxie's water breaks in Peter's car after leaving the Nurses' Ball. She has Peter pull over, and he helps deliver James on the side of the road. Maxie names him after his late father, Nathan and her step-father, Mac Scorpio.

Former characters

Lila Rae Alcazar

Lila Rae Alcazar is the daughter of Lorenzo Alcazar and Skye Quartermaine. She is named after Skye's adoptive grandmother, Lila Quartermaine, and Skye's biological mother, Rae Cummings.

Skye is reluctant to let Lorenzo be a part of Lila's life because of his mobster background. After Lila was born, they reconcile, with Lila Rae's last name being changed to her father's. Skye is revealed to be forced to stay with Lorenzo, who threatens to kill her if she tries to take the baby from him again. Skye helps Lorenzo's rival, Jason Morgan, get rid of Lorenzo. Skye gets Lila Rae back when she and Lorenzo plan on moving away, and Jason kills Lorenzo. Shortly after, Skye and Lila Rae leave town. Lila Rae visits Port Charles with Skye to meet her family and attend Edward Quartermaine's funeral.

Alec Barrett

Alec Barrett is the son of Aleksander Janáček and Brenda Barrett. Brenda believes she miscarried, but Alec's grandmother, Suzanne Stanwyck, fakes his death and keeps him hidden. When Brenda learns the truth, Suzanne brings Lucian to Brenda and claims he is her son. When Brenda decides to get a DNA test done, Suzanne takes Lucian back and tries to disappear with Alec, but is found by Sonny Corinthos, who returns Alec to Brenda. Brenda divorces Sonny, and she and Alec move to Rome, Italy.

Emma Drake

Emma Drake is the daughter of Patrick Drake and Robin Scorpio. The role is played by child actress Brooklyn Rae Silzer, who won a Young Artist Award in 2013 for Best Young Actress 10 And Under In A TV Series, for her role as Emma. She is born onscreen in November 2008. When Emma comes down with a fever, she and Robin get stranded in a snowstorm when they go to a doctor. Robin leaves her in Maxie Jones' care, who brings Emma to the hospital where she is diagnosed with pneumonia. When Lisa Niles becomes obsessed with Patrick, she kidnaps Emma, but Robin and Patrick save her. After Robin is presumed dead in a lab explosion, Patrick raises Emma alone. Robin is alive and calls home, but Patrick believes Emma is playing pretend when she tells him about the phone call. Emma does not approve of her father's new girlfriend, Dr. Britt Westbourne, and Patrick breaks up with Britt when he learns she has been treating Emma poorly. When Robin returns, she and Patrick reunite, and Emma and her parents relocate to Berkeley, California. Emma periodically returns with her mother, or to visit her grandmother Anna Devane.

Taylor DuBois

Taylor DuBois is the younger sister of Felix DuBois. Taylor comes to Port Charles to spend the summer with her big brother Felix (Marc Anthony Samuel) and falls for TJ Ashford (Tequan Richmond). The role was originated by Samantha Logan who made her first appearance on June 4, 2013. In September 2013, it was announced that the role had been recast with actress Pepi Sonuga who made her onscreen debut later that month.

Angela Durrell said Taylor's introduction would not only add to the dynamic for the younger characters, but would also make things interesting for the adults. Soap Opera Network said Logan's introduction came just in time for the usual summer teen storylines. The July 8 issue of Soaps In Depth listed Taylor at #3 in the "5 Things We're Loving" section. Jamey Giddens praised the actress and the dynamic that Taylor brought to the teen scene and likened Taylor and Molly to the '90s feud between Brenda Barrett (Vanessa Marcil) and Karen Wexler (Marie Wilson).

B. J. Jones

B. J. Jones is born on October 6, 1986, and is the daughter of Tony Jones and his first wife, Tania Roskov. She is named Barbara Jean in honor of nurse Bobbie Spencer, who helped with the delivery. Bobbie adopts B. J. and marries Tony years later after Tania dies in a car accident.

B. J. is left brain-dead after her school van is hit by a drunk driver in May 1994. Tony makes the decision to donate B. J.'s organs, and her heart was transplanted into her ailing cousin Maxie Jones. The storyline won critical acclaim and several awards for acting and writing.

In February 2009, as part of the ABC Daytime "Go Red" campaign for women with heart disease, the storyline was reprised. Maxie falls asleep after attending the "Go Red" fashion show in New York City; while asleep she dreams of an alternate universe where she died and B. J. lived. On October 6, 2011, Maxie celebrates B. J.'s birthday with a red heart balloon and a small stone saying "Barbara Jean Jones: Will not be forgotten."

Rafe Kovich, Jr.

Rafe Kovich, Jr. is the son of Stephen Clay and Alison Barrington, and the legal son of Rafe Kovich. The character was created from the storyline of the defunct spin-off series Port Charles, where the character was originally the son of Caleb Morley and Alison.

Rafe arrives in Port Charles with Alison, having spent most of his life on the run. He bonds with Molly Lansing when she buys him lunch. Soon after, he witnesses Alison being murdered by Caleb. John McBain finds Rafe next to his mother's body, and Rafe is arrested. Rafe insists he is innocent and accuses John. Caleb shows up to free Rafe, but Rafe escapes and hides in Molly's house before being discovered and sent back to jail. When Caleb kidnaps Molly's sister, Sam Morgan, and nephew, Danny, John and Rafe break out of prison with Lucy Coe to rescue them. While John and Lucy rescue Sam, Rafe watches over Danny to protect him from Heather Webber. He is adopted by Sam after being released by the police. When Stephen's brother Silas shows up in town, he sues Sam for custody of Rafe and wins, but he lets Rafe stay with Sam. The two bond, and Rafe moves in with his uncle. Rafe develops a crush on Molly, but she is dating TJ Ashford. Rafe tries to break them apart with Taylor DuBois' help. Molly cuts Rafe out of her life when she finds out. Upset and depressed, Rafe starts using cocaine and stealing money from Sam to get drugs. Rafe causes an accident to run Patrick Drake's family off the road. Rafe tries to skip town, but Molly catches up to him and they drive off in Silas' car. Rafe tells Molly he caused the accident, but was ordered to run Patrick off the road. Before he can tell Molly who ordered him, the car crashes. Rafe is rushed to the hospital with a serious head injury. He is left brain-dead and put on life support before his family say their farewells.

Oscar Nero

Oscar Nero, born on October 16, 2002, is the previously unknown son of Drew Cain (Billy Miller) and Dr. Kim Nero (Tamara Braun). The role was first played by Rio Mangini for two episodes on June 23 and 26, 2017. After Mangini joining the cast of Everything Sucks, the role was recast with Garren Stitt, who debuted a week later on July 7. Stitt exited the role on May 2, 2019, after Oscar dies from a brain tumor.

Teddy Rivera

Teddy Rivera is the son of Carlos Rivera and Sabrina Santiago. Teddy is born off-screen while Sabrina and Carlos are on the run. Teddy is in Puerto Rico being held captive by Carlos' friend, but Sabrina has her aunt, Inocencia Santos, take Teddy to Port Charles and give him to the Quartermaine family, and Tracy Quartermaine becomes Teddy's foster mother. Sabrina is rescued by Michael Corinthos and reunites with her son. Teddy falls sick and is diagnosed with botulism, and recovers in the hospital. After Sabrina is murdered, his paternal uncle, Joe Rivera, comes to take custody of Teddy. Despite Tracy's protests, Michael gives Teddy to Joe, who takes him back to Puerto Rico.

Gabriel Santiago 

Gabriel Drake Santiago is the son of Patrick Drake and Sabrina Santiago. Gabriel was born prematurely April 25, 2014, after his family are in a car accident. He is rushed to the hospital and treated by Britt Westbourne in the neonatal intensive-care unit. As his condition appears to improve, his family decides to name him Gabriel Drake Santiago. Gabriel's condition worsens when he is diagnosed with necrotizing enterocolitis, resulting in massive organ failure and his death.

References

Lists of General Hospital characters